State Route 103 (SR 103) is a  state highway in the southeastern part of the U.S. state of Alabama. The highway begins at the Florida state line and is a continuation of County Road 171 (formerly a state road). The northern terminus of the highway is at an intersection with SR 123 in Wicksburg, an unincorporated community north of the Geneva–Houston County line.

Route description

SR 103 travels primarily through eastern Geneva County. It is one of numerous highways that enter Alabama from the Florida Panhandle. Upon entering Alabama, the highway heads northward, traveling primarily through rural areas of the county along a two-lane roadway. At the approximate halfway point of the highway, it travels through Slocomb, the only incorporated community along its length.

Major intersections

See also

References

103
Transportation in Geneva County, Alabama
Transportation in Houston County, Alabama